The Volkswagen ID. Life is an electric subcompact SUV concept revealed by German automobile manufacturer Volkswagen at the 2021 International Motor Show Germany.

Overview

The Volkswagen ID. Life concept was revealed at International Motor Show Germany on September 7, 2021 in Munich, Germany. It is a retro-styled 5-door electric subcompact SUV. The ID. Life was designed by Klaus Zyciora and Slovak automobile designer Jozef Kabaň, who says "Volkswagen's design language always has to move in a more timeless direction. It fits the brand. We want to be authentic and clear and use real materials; there's no fake of any kind or trying to look like something else. Fake exhaust outlets, fake wood, and so on. We want our cars to be well balanced.”

Specifications

Technical specs
The Volkswagen ID. Life concept is built on Volkswagen's MEB platform, designed for electric vehicles. This is the first application of MEB to a front-drive vehicle.

Exterior
The ID. Life is finished in a white paint with a black matte retractable roof constructed of textile and plastic material, which is also used on the hood. The front grille and rear tailgate feature Volkswagen's illuminated logo, used on EVs and concept vehicles, as well as squarish-shaped headlights and taillights.

Interior

The interior of the ID. Life concept is made from recycle materials and natural wood and seats four. With the second row seats folded down, the ID. Life has a cargo space of 40.3 cubic feet.

Production model
The Volkswagen ID. Life concept previews a production model that will be released by 2025 as a €20,000 (US$24,000) electric subcompact SUV, likely to be called the Volkswagen ID.2 or the ID.1, positioned under the ID.3 hatchback. It will be based on the same MEB platform used by the concept and all other Volkswagen ID. series EVs.

References

Electric concept cars
ID. Life
Retro-style automobiles
Front-wheel-drive vehicles